Anamera concolor is a species of beetle in the family Cerambycidae. It was described by Lacordaire in 1869. It is known from Laos.

References

Lamiini
Beetles described in 1869